Governance, risk management and compliance (GRC) is the term covering an organization's approach across these three practices: governance, risk management, and compliance. The first scholarly research on GRC was published in 2007 where GRC was formally defined as "the integrated collection of capabilities that enable an organization to reliably achieve objectives, address uncertainty and act with integrity." The research referred to common "keep the company on track" activities conducted in departments such as internal audit, compliance, risk, legal, finance, IT, HR as well as the lines of business, executive suite and the board itself.

Overview 
Governance, risk management, and compliance are three related facets that aim to assure an organization reliably achieves objectives, addresses uncertainty and acts with integrity. Governance is the combination of processes established and executed by the directors (or the board of directors) that are reflected in the organization's structure and how it is managed and led toward achieving goals. Risk management is predicting and managing risks that could hinder the organization from reliably achieving its objectives under uncertainty. Compliance refers to adhering with the mandated boundaries (laws and regulations) and voluntary boundaries (company's policies, procedures, etc.).

GRC is a discipline that aims to synchronize information and activity across governance, and compliance in order to operate more efficiently, enable effective information sharing, more effectively report activities and avoid wasteful overlaps. Although interpreted differently in various organizations, GRC typically encompasses activities such as corporate governance, enterprise risk management (ERM) and corporate compliance with applicable laws and regulations.

Organizations reach a size where coordinated control over GRC activities is required to operate effectively. Each of these three disciplines creates information of value to the other two, and all three impact the same technologies, people, processes and information.

Substantial duplication of tasks evolves when governance, risk management and compliance are managed independently.  Overlapping and duplicated GRC activities negatively impact both operational costs and GRC matrices. For example, each internal service might be audited and assessed by multiple groups on an annual basis, creating enormous cost and disconnected results. A disconnected GRC approach will also prevent an organization from providing real-time GRC executive reports. GRC supposes that this approach, like a badly planned transport system, every individual route will operate, but the network will lack the qualities that allow them to work together effectively.

If not integrated, if tackled in a traditional "silo" approach, most organizations must sustain unmanageable numbers of GRC-related requirements due to changes in technology, increasing data storage, market globalization and increased regulation.

GRC topics

Basic concepts 
 Governance describes the overall management approach through which senior executives direct and control the entire organization, using a combination of management information and hierarchical management control structures. Governance activities ensure that critical management information reaching the executive team is sufficiently complete, accurate and timely to enable appropriate management decision making, and provide the control mechanisms to ensure that strategies, directions and instructions from management are carried out systematically and effectively.
Obligational awareness refers to the ability of the organisation to make itself aware of all of its mandatory and voluntary obligations, namely relevant laws, regulatory requirements, industry codes and organizational standards, as well as standards of good governance, generally accepted best practices, ethics and community expectations.  These obligations may be financial, strategic or operational where operational includes such diverse areas as property safety, product safety, food safety, workplace health and safety, asset maintenance, etc.
 Risk management is the set of processes through which management identifies, analyzes, and, where necessary, responds appropriately to risks that might adversely affect realization of the organization's business objectives. The response to risks typically depends on their perceived gravity, and involves controlling, avoiding, accepting or transferring them to a third party, whereas organizations routinely manage a wide range of risks (e.g. technological risks, commercial/financial risks, information security risks etc.).
 Compliance means conforming with stated requirements. At an organizational level, it is achieved through management processes which identify the applicable requirements (defined for example in laws, regulations, contracts, strategies and policies), assess the state of compliance, assess the risks and potential costs of non-compliance against the projected expenses to achieve compliance, and hence prioritize, fund and initiate any corrective actions deemed necessary. Compliance administration refers to the administrative exercise of keeping all the compliance documents up to date, maintaining the currency of the risk controls and producing the compliance reports.

GRC market segmentation 
A GRC program can be instituted to focus on any individual area within the enterprise, or a fully integrated GRC is able to work across all areas of the enterprise, using a single framework.

A fully integrated GRC uses a single core set of control material, mapped to all of the primary governance factors being monitored.  The use of a single framework also has the benefit of reducing the possibility of duplicated remedial actions.

When reviewed as individual GRC areas, the most common individual headings are considered to be Financial GRC, Operational GRC, WHS GRC, IT GRC, and Legal GRC.

Financial GRC relates to the activities that are intended to ensure the correct operation of all financial processes, as well as compliance with any finance-related mandates.
Operational GRC relates to all operational activities such as property safety, product safety, food safety, workplace health and safety, IT compliance asset maintenance, etc. 
WHS GRC, a subset of Operational GRC, relates to all workplace health and safety activities
IT GRC, a subset of Operational GRC, relates to the activities intended to ensure that the IT (Information Technology) organization supports the current and future needs of the business, and complies with all IT-related mandates.
Legal GRC focuses on tying together all three components via an organization's legal department and chief compliance officer. This however can be misleading as ISO 37301 refers to mandatory and voluntary obligations and a focus on legal GRC can introduce bias.

The AICD (Australian Institute of Company Directors) however splits risk into three super groups

 Financial Risk
 Operational Risk
 Strategic Risk

Analysts disagree on how these aspects of GRC are defined as market categories.  Gartner has stated that the broad GRC market includes the following areas:
Finance and audit GRC
IT GRC management
Enterprise risk management.

They further divide the IT GRC management market into these key capabilities.  
Controls and policy library
Policy distribution and response
IT Controls self-assessment and measurement
IT Asset repository
Automated general computer control (GCC) collection
Remediation and exception management
Reporting
Advanced IT risk evaluation and compliance dashboards

GRC product vendors 
The distinctions between the sub-segments of the broad GRC market are often not clear.  With a large number of vendors entering this market recently, determining the best product for a given business problem can be challenging.  Given that the analysts do not fully agree on the market segmentation, vendor positioning can increase the confusion.

Owing to the dynamic nature of this market, any vendor analysis is often out of date relatively soon after its publication.

Broadly, the vendor market can be considered to exist in three segments:

Integrated GRC solutions (multi-governance interest, enterprise wide)
Domain specific GRC solutions (single governance interest, enterprise wide)
Point solutions to GRC (relate to enterprise wide governance or enterprise wide risk or enterprise wide compliance but not in combination.)

Integrated GRC solutions attempt to unify the management of these areas, rather than treat them as separate entities.  An integrated solution is able to administer one central library of compliance controls, but manage, monitor and present them against every governance factor.  For example, in a domain specific approach, three or more findings could be generated against a single broken activity.  The integrated solution recognizes this as one break relating to the mapped governance factors.

Domain specific GRC vendors understand the cyclical connection between governance, risk and compliance within a particular area of governance.  For example, within financial processing — that a risk will either relate to the absence of a control (need to update governance) and/or the lack of adherence to (or poor quality of) an existing control.  An initial goal of splitting out GRC into a separate market has left some vendors confused about the lack of movement.  It is thought that a lack of deep education within a domain on the audit side, coupled with a mistrust of audit in general causes a rift in a corporate environment.  However, there are vendors in the marketplace that, while remaining domain-specific, have begun marketing their product to end users and departments that, while either tangential or overlapping, have expanded to include the internal corporate internal audit (CIA) and external audit teams (tier 1 big four AND tier two and below), information security and operations/production as the target audience.  This approach provides a more 'open book' approach into the process.  If the production team will be audited by CIA using an application that production also has access to, is thought to reduce risk more quickly as the end goal is not to be 'compliant' but to be 'secure,' or as secure as possible. You can also try the various GRC Tools available in market which are based on automation and can reduce your work load.

Point solutions to GRC are marked by their focus on addressing only one of its areas.  In some cases of limited requirements, these solutions can serve a viable purpose.  However, because they tend to have been designed to solve domain specific problems in great depth, they generally do not take a unified approach and are not tolerant of integrated governance requirements.  Information systems will address these matters better if the requirements for GRC management are incorporated at the design stage, as part of a coherent framework.

GRC data warehousing and business intelligence 
GRC vendors with an integrated data framework are now able to offer custom built GRC data warehouse and business intelligence solutions.  This allows high value data from any number of existing GRC applications to be collated and analysed.

The aggregation of GRC data using this approach adds significant benefit in the early identification of risk and business process (and business control) improvement.

Further benefits to this approach include (i) it allows existing, specialist and high value applications to continue without impact (ii) organizations can manage an easier transition into an integrated GRC approach because the initial change is only adding to the reporting layer and (iii) it provides a real-time ability to compare and contrast data value across systems that previously had no common data scheme.'

GRC research 
A publication review carried out in 2009  found that there was hardly any scientific research on GRC. The authors went on to derive the first GRC short-definition from an extensive literature review. Subsequently, the definition was validated in a survey among GRC professionals. "GRC is an integrated, holistic approach to organisation-wide GRC ensuring that an organisation acts ethically correct and in accordance with its risk appetite, internal policies and external regulations through the alignment of strategy, processes, technology and people, thereby improving efficiency and effectiveness." The authors then translated the definition into a frame of reference for GRC research.

Each of the core disciplines – Governance, Risk Management and Compliance – consists of the four basic components: strategy, processes, technology and people.
The organisation's risk appetite, its internal policies and external regulations constitute the rules of GRC. The disciplines, their components and rules are now to be merged in an integrated, holistic and organisation-wide (the three main characteristics of GRC) manner – aligned with the (business) operations that are managed and supported through GRC. In applying this approach, organisations long to achieve the objectives: ethically correct behaviour, and improved efficiency and effectiveness of any of the elements involved.

See also 
 Conformity assessment
 Information governance
 ISO 37301:2021 Compliance Management Systems (Previously ISO 19600)
 ISO 31000:2018 Risk Management
 ISO 41001:2018 Facility management — Management systems
 Legal governance, risk management, and compliance
 Records management
 Regulatory compliance

References 

Business software
Enterprise modelling